Ludovico Camangi (14 February 1903, Sora, Lazio – 2 September 1976) was an Italian politician. He represented the Italian Republican Party in the Constituent Assembly of Italy from 1946 to 1948 and in the Chamber of Deputies from 1948 to 1968.

References

1903 births
1976 deaths
People from the Province of Frosinone
Italian Republican Party politicians
Members of the Constituent Assembly of Italy
Members of the Chamber of Deputies (Italy)
Politicians of Lazio
People from Sora, Lazio